Glenn Ficarra (born May 27, 1969) is an American filmmaker and actor. He frequently collaborated with John Requa.

Life and career
Ficarra met John Requa at Pratt Institute, where both were studying film. After college they went to work in animation for the TV channel Nickelodeon.

As writers they wrote the comedy films Cats & Dogs (directed by Lawrence Guterman), Bad Santa (directed by Terry Zwigoff), and Bad News Bears (directed by Richard Linklater).

In 2009 they made their directorial debut with their self-penned I Love You Phillip Morris, based on the life of con man Steven Jay Russell. For their writing on this film, Ficarra and Requa received a nomination for the Writers Guild of America Award for Best Adapted Screenplay.

Their subsequent release was the comedy Crazy, Stupid, Love starring Steve Carell, Ryan Gosling, Emma Stone and Julianne Moore, again directed with Requa, released in July 2011.

With Requa and Charlie Gogolak he has formed the production company Zaftig Films.

The pair also directed Focus, starring Will Smith and Margot Robbie, and Whiskey Tango Foxtrot, starring Tina Fey and Robbie.

As of August 2017, Ficarra and Requa are in final negotiations to co-direct and co-write a film featuring Harley Quinn and The Joker set in the DC Extended Universe with Margot Robbie and Jared Leto reprising their roles. His Zaftig company signed a deal with Fox Entertainment, more recently.

Filmography

Film

Executive producer
 Storks (2016)
 DC League of Super-Pets (2022)

Television

References

External links

 

1971 births
Living people
American film directors
American film producers
American male actors
American male screenwriters
American male television writers
American television directors
American television producers
Place of birth missing (living people)
Pratt Institute alumni